William Younger  may refer to:
 William Younger (brewery), an Edinburgh-based brewery that was part of Scottish Brewers, later Scottish & Newcastle, now a brand of Wells & Young
William Younger I, whose son Archibald Campbell Younger named the eponymous brewery for him
 Sir William Younger, 1st Baronet, of Auchen Castle (1862–1937), Scottish politician
 William L. Younger (1894–1977), American football player, coach, and college athletics administrator
 William McEwan Younger (1905–1992), Scottish brewer and political activist